CKER may refer to:

CKER-FM, a radio station in Edmonton, Alberta.
CKER-TV, a television station in Kahnawake, Quebec.
CKER Chantal, a financial advice company in Zelhem, Netherlands.